Otto Roesner (December 22, 1881 – August 1951) was an American gymnast. He competed in four events at the 1904 Summer Olympics.

References

External links
 

1881 births
1951 deaths
American male artistic gymnasts
Olympic gymnasts of the United States
Gymnasts at the 1904 Summer Olympics
Sportspeople from Lansing, Michigan